Ron Curry may refer to:

 Ronald Curry (born 1979), former American football wide receiver
 Ron Curry (basketball) (born 1993), American basketball player

See also
 Ron Currie Jr. (born 1975), American author